was a son of Yasutoki and the father of Tsunetoki and Tokiyori.

Tokiuji was expected to be the future shikken (regent) by his father, but he lost his health while he served as the Rokuhara Tandai (Kitakata) in Kyoto.

His wife Matsushita Zenni is known as a wise lady.

References

Tokiuji
People of Kamakura-period Japan
1203 births
1230 deaths